Clifford Fraser (October 10, 1957 – November 20, 2022) was a Canadian professional wrestler, known as the midget wrestler Farmer Brooks. He was a major participant in Grand Prix Wrestling throughout the 1980s and a longtime rival of Sky Low Low.

Professional wrestling career
Clifford Fraser moved to Rexdale in Toronto when he was growing up. He later dropped out of school and trained to become a professional wrestler under Whipper Billy Watson. He also was a member of Earl Sullivan's  Sully's Gym, another wrestling program. During his career, his most prolonged rivalry was with Sky Low Low. He retired in 1992 when Grand Prix Wrestling closed.

Personal life
After retiring from the wrestling business, Fraser began working in New Glasgow, Nova Scotia.

His mother's name is Stacia Fraser. He was married to Kim Hutt and had four children: Andrew, Leanna, Blair, and Shelby. 

Fraser died on November 20, 2022 after a short illness.

References

1957 births
2022 deaths
Canadian male professional wrestlers
Midget professional wrestlers
People from New Glasgow, Nova Scotia
Professional wrestlers from Nova Scotia